Mount Gravatt is a southern suburb of the City of Brisbane, Queensland, Australia and a prominent hill and lookout within this suburb.

Geography 
The suburb is situated in the south-east of the city and was one of Brisbane's largest. This was before it was divided into Mount Gravatt East, Upper Mount Gravatt and Mount Gravatt South; the last being renamed Wishart in the early 1990s.

History 
The hill was named Mount Gravatt in 1840 by surveyor Robert Dixon after Lieutenant George Gravatt who was the commander of the Moreton Bay penal colony from May to July 1839. Gravatt was later transferred to India where he died in 1843.

Mount Gravatt State School was opened on 29 June 1874.

In 1888, 3 sections of 107 allotments, 6 and 7 acres were advertised to be auctioned on 24 November as 'The Abdington Estate Mount Gravatt'.
 

Between 1953 and 1969 electric trams ran from the suburb into Brisbane's Central Business District (CBD) along Logan Road. As Mount Gravatt was the end of the line, part of the area was known locally as "The Terminus".

Mount Gravatt East State School (in neighbouring Mount Gravatt East) was opened on 29 August 1955.

Mount Gravatt State High School opened in 1960.

St Agnes Catholic Primary School opened on 1 January 1962.

The Mount Gravatt Library opened in 1967.

St Catherine's School (in neighbouring Wishart) opened on 4 March 1971.

Mount Gravatt Special School opened on 17 May 1971. On 21 September 2012, it was relocated Mackenzie State Primary School (which was formerly Mount Petrie State School in Mackenzie) where it was renamed  Mackenzie Special School.

Griffith University (in neighbouring Nathan) opened its main campus in 1975.

Yarranlea State School opened in Yarranlea (in the Toowoomba Region) on 22 January 1883 and closed on 9 December 1977. In 1979 it was relocated to Mount Gravatt College of Advanced Education (a teacher training institution) as a museum school. It was then relocated to the Griffith University campus and reopened on 27 January 1987, known as Old Yarranlea State School) to provide teacher training in a one-teacher school environment (typical of schools in many regional communities of Queensland).To that end, enrolments in the school were limited to 18 students. However, the school was closed at the end 2013 due to having fewer than 150 students and being within five kilometres of three state schools. Due to the support of parents and the public, it reopened as Yarranlea Primary School (an independent school) in July 2014.

Mount Gravatt was once a popular destination of German, Irish and English Immigrants to Australia after World War 1 and 2. The suburb has a growing number of Southern European Australians (mostly from Greece and Italy).

Circa 1975, the suburb was populated by middle class, young families seeking stability. 

Languages other than English spoken at home included Arabic 1.1%, Mandarin 1.0%, Punjabi 1.0%, Greek 0.7% and Italian 0.7%.

Education 
Mount Gravatt State School is a government primary (Prep-6) school for boys and girls at 1263 Logan Road. In 2017, the school had an enrolment of 231 students with 24 teachers (17 full-time equivalent) and 18 non-teaching staff (11 full-time equivalent). It includes a special education program.

St Agnes School is a Catholic primary (Prep-6) school for boys and girls at 29 Tudor Street. In 2017, the school had an enrolment of 312 students with 29 teachers (20 full-time equivalent) and 21 non-teaching staff (11 full-time equivalent).

Yarranlea Primary School is a private primary (Prep-6) school for boys and girls at 176 Messines Ridge Road. In 2017, the school had an enrolment of 25 students with 4 teachers (2 full-time equivalent) and 4 non-teaching staff (2 full-time equivalent).

Mount Gravatt State High School is a government secondary (7-12) school for boys and girls at Loreburn Street. In 2017, the school had an enrolment of 1196 students with 98 teachers (91 full-time equivalent) and 43 non-teaching staff (31 full-time equivalent). It includes a special education program.

Facilities 
The Mount Gravatt Showgrounds are an important centre for cultural and community activities and the site of the annual Mount Gravatt Show, an agricultural fair. The grounds are positioned on Logan Road, opposite the mega-church, Hillsong Brisbane Campus (formerly known as Garden City Christian Church).

The Mount Gravatt Library which is operated by the Brisbane City Council operates is located at 8 Creek Road.

Sport 
Mount Gravatt sport includes:
 Easts Mt Gravatt rugby league club.
Mount Gravatt Australian Rules Football Club in the Queensland State League. The club were premiers in 2007.
The Mount Gravatt Hawks Soccer Club plays in the Brisbane Premier League.

Mount Gravatt Lookout

Mount Gravatt Lookout is accessible via Shire Road which winds its way past water towers up to the lookout carpark and a communications tower.

There is a large cave complex located on a walking trail on the southern slope of the mountain.

Transport 
Since the closure of the tram network in 1969, the public transport has been provided by buses operated by Brisbane Transport and a local bus company the Mount Gravatt Bus Service. The South East Busway is connected by a service from Mount Gravatt Central to the Busway terminal at Griffith University.

References

External links

Suburbs of the City of Brisbane
Gravatt
Geography of Brisbane
1840 establishments in Australia
Lookouts in Queensland